Christian Johannes de Nysschen  (31 January 1936 – 2 November 2016 ) was a South African rugby union player.

Playing career
De Nysschen was born in Ladysmith and went to school, first in Bergville and later in Ladysmith, where he wrote matric at Ladysmith High School.

De Nysschen toured with the Springboks to Australia and New Zealand in 1956. He did not play in any test matches, but did play in ten tour matches and scored one try.

See also
List of South Africa national rugby union players – Springbok no. 334

References

1936 births
2016 deaths
South African rugby union players
South Africa international rugby union players
Sharks (Currie Cup) players
Rugby union players from KwaZulu-Natal
Rugby union locks